Brico is a Belgian hardware store-chain. The chain focuses mainly on DIY items, but also sells garden related articles. The chain has 140 locations (as of February 2016) spread over Belgium, about 95 of which are franchised.

History
The first store opened in 1973 in Schoten. The name Brico comes from the French bricoler, which means to do DIY. During the 1980s, Brico produced two brands of its own, namely Stop and Bricobi. Currently these brands are known as Central Park and Sencys. Until 2002 Brico was part of the GIB Group, when it was sold to the Dutch Vendex (currently Maxeda). Maxeda also owns the Hardware store-chains Praxis and Formido.

Former locations of Leroy Merlin in Belgium have become part of Brico NV and have been reformed and renamed to Plan-It. These stores focus mainly on larger DIY and decoration projects.

In 2006, first Brico City shops were opened. These are smaller stores in the city centers (Antwerp, Brussels, Liege, Ghent ) that focus on most basic and easy-to-store items.

Sponsoring 
During the 1990s, the chain was co-sponsor of the Mapei cycling team via the brand Bricobi.

e-shop 
In 2006 Brico started its own webshop. The webshop is part of the Brico website.

External links
 Brico.be, Official website of Brico

References 

Retail companies of Belgium
Retail companies established in 1973
Hardware stores